Who Killed Vincent Chin? is a 1987 American documentary film produced and directed by Christine Choy and Renee Tajima-Peña that recounts the murder of Vincent Chin. It was nominated for the Academy Award for Best Documentary Feature. It was later broadcast as part of the PBS series POV.

In 2021, the film was selected for preservation in the United States National Film Registry by the Library of Congress as being "culturally, historically, or aesthetically significant".

Overview
On a summer night in Detroit, two white autoworkers fatally beat Vincent Chin, a 27-year-old Chinese engineer, with a baseball bat. The film tracks the incident from the initial eye-witness accounts through the trial and its repercussions for the families involved, and the American justice system at large. After an outcry from the Asian American community, led by Vincent's mother Lily Chin, the case becomes a civil rights Supreme Court case. The case ends with tried killer Ronald Ebens' being let go with a suspended sentence and a small fine.

Awards
Alfred I. duPont–Columbia University Award, Silver Baton (1991)
Hawaii International Film Festival, Best Documentary Award (1988) 
Academy Awards, Best Documentary Feature Nominee (1989)

See also
Vincent Who?, 2009 documentary about the same case.

References

External links

Who Killed Vincent Chin? at POV
Who Killed Vincent Chin? at Filmakers Library

1987 films
1987 documentary films
American documentary films
Documentary films about Asian Americans
Films about Chinese Americans
Documentary films about racism in the United States
1980s English-language films
1980s Mandarin-language films
Documentary films about Detroit
Documentary films about the automotive industry
Films set in Detroit
Culture of Detroit
United States National Film Registry films
Chinese-language American films
1980s American films